A Hermit is an oil on oak panel painting by Dutch Golden Age painter Gerrit Dou, created c. 1661. It depicts a monkish figure, of very old age, surrounded by symbols of vanitas (skull, candle, hourglass), which serve as a reminder of the brevity of human life. He looks at the viewer, as he leafs through the Bible open in front of him.

The painting is displayed at the Wallace Collection, in London.

References

External links
Wallace Collection

1661 paintings
Paintings in the Wallace Collection
Paintings by Gerrit Dou
Art of the Dutch Golden Age
Christian paintings